George Fleming may refer to:

 Sir George Fleming, 2nd Baronet (1667–1747), British churchman
 George Fleming (American football) (1938–2021), American football player and politician in Washington State
 George Fleming (composer), composer with Steve Winwood on albums including Arc of a Diver, Back in the High Life, and The Finer Things
 George Fleming (engineer), Scottish civil engineer
 George Fleming (explorer) (1800?–1880?), African American explorer and trader
 George S. Fleming, American filmmaker
 George Fleming (footballer, born 1859) (1859–1912), Scottish footballer (Everton)
 George Fleming (footballer, born 1869) (1869–1922), Scottish footballer (Wolves, Liverpool)
 George Fleming (footballer, born 1948), Scottish footballer (Hearts, Dundee United)
 George Raphael Fleming (1850–1909), Scottish rugby union player
 George Fleming (veterinarian) (1833–1901), Scottish veterinary surgeon
 Julia Constance Fletcher or George Fleming (1853–1938), American writer

See also
 George Fleming Davis (1911–1945), US Navy officer and Medal of Honor recipient